Glenn Smits (born 24 October 1990) is a Dutch tennis player.

Smits has a career high ATP doubles ranking of 721 achieved on 28 May 2018. In 2018 he achieved his highest ranking (389) in the doubles with Botic van de Zandschulp.

Smits made his ATP main draw debut at the 2015 ABN AMRO World Tennis Tournament in the doubles draw partnering Jesse Huta Galung and in 2017 with Robin Haase.

External links
 
 

1990 births
Dutch male tennis players
Living people
20th-century Dutch people
21st-century Dutch people